William Murphy (9 February 1889 – 18 February 1916) was a Canadian rower. He competed in the men's eight event at the 1912 Summer Olympics. He died following an injury sustained in a rugby match.

References

External links
 

1889 births
1916 deaths
Canadian male rowers
Olympic rowers of Canada
Rowers at the 1912 Summer Olympics
Sportspeople from Kingston, Ontario
Sport deaths in Canada
Accidental deaths in Ontario